Beihania is a genus of moths of the family Noctuidae.

Species
Beihania anartoides  (Warnecke, 1938)
Beihania cuculliela  Wiltshire, 1967
Beihania hyatti  Wiltshire, 1967
Beihania montaguei  Wiltshire, 1980
Beihania philbyi  Wiltshire, 1980

References
Natural History Museum Lepidoptera genus database

Calpinae